Shubha Balsavar (née Khote) is an Indian film and television actress who has worked in several Hindi-language and few Marathi-language films. She is also a former women's national champion in swimming and cycling.

Early life and education
Shubha Khote was born into a Marathi-Konkani family, the daughter of noted Marathi theatre personality Nandu Khote by his wife, a Konkani lady from Mangalore in Karnataka. The actor Viju Khote was her younger brother. Veteran actress Durga Khote was the wife of Shubha's father's brother. Shubha's maternal uncle, Nayampalli, was also an actor.

Shubha Khote studied at St. Teresa's High School, Charni Road and St.Columba school (Gamdevi). As a girl, she excelled at swimming and cycling, and in an era when very few women even ventured into such sports, she was women's national champion in swimming and cycling for three successive years, 1952–55. After completing school, she graduated in English Literature from Wilson College.

Shubha is married to D. M. Balsavar, who is (like Shubha's mother) from Mangalore. He was the Vice President of Marketing in Nocil, a major Indian corporate. He appeared in a cameo in the Marathi movie Chimukla Pahuna (1968), which she produced and directed. Their daughter, Bhavana Balsavar is also a TV actress.

Career

She made her stage debut as child actor at age 4, and her film debut in Seema (1955) as Putli. Her good cycling made her widely known, and led to Seema's team casting her. Since then, she has starred in a large number of Hindi and Marathi movies, stage shows, and TV serials. She mostly starred opposite Mehmood and the pair became hit in Sasural, Bharosa, Ziddi, Chhoti Behan, Sanjh Aur Savera, Love in Tokyo, Grahasthi, Humrahi and Beti Bete. She also played negative roles in Paying Guest and Ek Duuje Ke Liye. In 1962, at the 9th Filmfare Awards, she received two nominations for Filmfare Award for Best Supporting Actress for Gharana  and Sasural, though she lost to Nirupa Roy.

She has directed comedy plays such as Hera Pheri, Hum Dono, Bachelor's Wife and Let's Do it (2000). Her home production Bachelor's Wives (adapted from the Marathi play Gholat Ghol) had more than 40 performances in Mumbai and Aurangabad. Her TV show Zabaan Sambhalke (based on the Mind Your Language series) was a major hit.

She has also worked in the Marathi teleserial Eka Lagnachi Teesri Goshta on Zee Marathi.

Selected filmography 
Movies

 Seema (1955)
 Paying Guest (1957)
 Dekh Kabira Roya (1957)
 Mujrim (1958)
 Didi (1959)
 Chhoti Bahen (1959)
 Anari (1959)
 Gharana (1961)
 Sasural (1961)
 Hamrahi (1963)
 Grahasti (1963)
 Dil Ek Mandir (1963)
 Ziddi (1964)
 Phoolon Ki Sej (1964)
 Akashdeep (1965)
 Love in Tokyo (1966)
 Tumse Achha Kaun Hai (1969)
 Mili (1975)
 Benaam (1974)
 Gol Maal (1979)
 Badalte Rishtey (1978)
 Naseeb (1981)
 Ek Duuje Ke Liye (1981)
 Suraag (1982)
Ek Din Bahu Ka (1983)
Pukar
Main Awara Hoon (1983)
 Coolie (1983)
Mera Faisla (1984)
Gangvaa (1984)
 Hum Dono (1985)
 Haqeeqat 
 Saagar (1985)
 Aakhir Kyon?  (1985)
Mazloom (1986)
 Swarag Se Sunder (1986)
  Hifazat  (1987)
 Maza Pati Karodpati (1988)
 Khoon Bhari Maang (1988)
 Billoo Badshah (1989)
 Kishen Kanhaiya (1990)
 Jawani Zindabad (1990)
 Sher Dil (1990)
Pyar Hua Chori Chori (1990)
Karz Chukana Hai (1991)
 Dil Hai Ki Manta Nahin (1991)
 Saudagar (1991)
 Ek Ladka Ek Ladki (1992)
 Parda Hai Parda (1992)
 Junoon (1992)
 Anari (1993)
 Waqt Hamara Hai (1993)
 Saajan Ka Ghar (1994)
 Sangdil Sanam (1994)
 Koyla (1997)
 Sirf Tum (1999)
 Shararat (2002)
 Toilet: Ek Prem Katha (2017)
 Bucket List (2018)
 Double XL (2022)

TV
 Junoon (1994)
 Zabaan Sambhalke (1993)
 Ek Raja Ek Rani (1996)
 Andaaz (1998)
 Dam Dama Dam (1998-1999)
 Jugni Chali Jalandhar (2008-2010)
 Baa Bahoo Aur Baby (2010)
 Eka Lagnachi Teesri Goshta (2013 Marathi)
 Mangalam Dangalam (2018-2019)
 Spy Bahu (2022)
 Thipkyanchi Rangoli (2022)

Awards 
 Nominated – Filmfare Award for Best Supporting Actress – Gharana (1962)
 Nominated – Filmfare Award for Best Supporting Actress – Sasural (1962)

References 

 Shubha Khote – Memories

External links
 
 

Living people
Indian television actresses
Indian film actresses
Actresses in Hindi cinema
Indian stage actresses
Actresses from Mumbai
University of Mumbai alumni
Indian theatre directors
Actresses in Hindi television
Indian women theatre directors
20th-century Indian actresses
21st-century Indian actresses
Year of birth missing (living people)